Heikel is a surname from a widely branched Finnish family descended from the Heikkilä farm in the village of Oulunsuu, now a district of Oulu in Finland. Jakob Henriksson Heikkilä sold the farm in 1723 and became a merchant in Oulu. His children changed the name to Heikel; three of his sons studied at the Universities of Uppsala and Turku. In time, the Heikel family became a significant scholarly family in Finland. Branches of the family also live in Sweden and Denmark. A large number of members of the family, under the influence of the Fennoman movement, fennicized the name to Heikinheimo in the 20th century. Varying spellings of the name have occurred in older times, such as Heickel and Heikell, while confusion with another unrelated family Heickell also occurs.

People with the name Heikel include:

 Anna Heikel (1838–1907), Finnish educator and Baptist pioneer
 Axel Heikel (1851–1924), Finnish ethnographer
 Carl Johan Heikel (1786–1896), Finnish lawmaker
  (1852–1917), Finnish architect
 Felix Heikel (1844–1921), Finnish economist and politician
 Henrik Heikel (1808–1867), Finnish priest and educator
 Ivar Heikel (1861–1952), Finnish philologist
 Rosina Heikel (1842–1929), Finnish doctor
  (1863–1936), Finnish forester and politician
 Viktor Heikel (1842–1927), Finnish gymnastics teacher
 Yngvar Heikel (1889–1956), Finnish ethnologist

References 

Finnish families
Surnames of Finnish origin